The 2011 Cerezo Osaka season is Cerezo Osaka's 2nd consecutive season, 13th season overall in J. League Division 1 and 39th overall in the Japanese top flight. It also includes the 2011 J. League Cup, 2011 Emperor's Cup, and the 2011 AFC Champions League.

Players

Current squad
As of December 18, 2010

Out on loan

2011 season transfers
In Winter

In Summer

Out Winter

Out Summer

J. League

League table

Matches

Results by round

J. League Cup

Emperor's Cup

AFC Champions League

Group stage

Knock-out stage

References

Cerezo Osaka
Cerezo Osaka seasons